The Saskatoon Legends were a minor league baseball team during the 2003 season. They played in the Canadian Baseball League, which was not a part of Minor League Baseball and therefore not affiliated with Major League Baseball or its member clubs. 

The Legends played out of Cairns Field. 

The team featured a mixture of former major league players mixed with up and coming prospects. 

The names from that team which some may recognize are former Montreal Expos pitcher Floyd Youmans and Sioux Falls Canaries' outfielder Ben Van Iderstine.

The team was largely a success on the field, however that success did not translate into success with attendance. The team challenged the Calgary Outlaws for the West Division title, right up until the all-star break which unfortunately was the end of the season. They finished the abbreviated season with a 22-15 record, good for second place in the West Division. The team did little to help matters at the box office. 

Marketing was almost nonexistent, and many baseball fans were unaware the team even existed.

All-Time Roster

References
http://www.losportitaliano.it/2005/news/feb05/baseball5.htm

http://www.thebaseballcube.com/teams/rosters/2003/75.shtml

External links
 Official Site (Courtesy Of The Internet Archive Wayback Machine)
 http://jonathanaldridge.com/

Defunct minor league baseball teams
Sport in Saskatoon
Defunct baseball teams in Canada
Defunct sports teams in Saskatchewan
Baseball teams in Saskatchewan
2003 establishments in Saskatchewan
2003 disestablishments in Saskatchewan
Baseball teams established in 2003
Defunct independent baseball league teams
Baseball teams disestablished in 2003